Kiser Lake (previously also known as Mosquito Lake) is a reservoir in Champaign County, Ohio located approximately  northwest of St. Paris and  north of Dayton along Ohio State Route 235, at .  The community of Grandview Heights sits on the southern shore of the lake, the  Kiser Lake Wetlands State Nature Preserve at the headwaters on the southeastern edge, and the  Kiser Lake State Park surrounds the rest of the lake to the north.

History
Mosquito Lake was first created in 1840, when a dam was built across Mosquito Creek in the low, swampy region of Champaign County known as Mosquito Creek Valley to build a grist and saw mill.  After operations at the mill were shut down, the dam and lake were neglected for several years. In 1932, John W. Kiser and his family owned the land and donated several hundred acres to the State of Ohio to rebuild the lake for recreational purposes. In 1939 work on the dam started, and in 1940, all work was completed on the dam and Kiser Lake was filled.

The lake is maintained by the Ohio Department of Natural Resources.

References

Champaign County, Ohio
Reservoirs in Ohio